Shawn Crawford (born January 14, 1978) is a retired American sprint athlete. He competed in the 100 meters and 200 meters events. In the 200 meter sprint, Crawford won gold at the 2004 Summer Olympics and silver at the 2008 Summer Olympics. He originally finished 4th in the race but after the 2nd and 3rd-place winners were disqualified, he moved up to a silver. On April 17, 2013, Crawford was  suspended for two years for missing out-of-competition drug tests. His coach, Bob Kersee claimed that Crawford retired after the 2012 United States Olympic Trials and USA Track & Field said he filed retirement papers in 2013.

Biography
Crawford was born in Van Wyck, South Carolina. He attended Indian Land High School before leaving for Clemson University, where he claimed eleven All-America honors and three national championships.

In 2001 Crawford started the year with a victory at the Indoor World Championships in the 200 m. He then went to the World Athletics Championships, where he tied with Kim Collins of Saint Kitts and Nevis for the 200 m bronze medal. At the Goodwill Games, he claimed his second gold medal of the year.

Crawford became known for his outrageous antics and lack of focus. At a 2002 meet in Milan, he donned a Phantom of the Opera mask that obstructed his vision during the 200 m race, causing him to run out of his lane and be disqualified.

In January 2003, Crawford starred in an episode of the Fox TV show Man vs. Beast in which he raced a zebra and a giraffe over 100 m on dirt. In the first race, he easily bested the giraffe. The zebra race was very close. Accusing the zebra of a false start, he re-raced the zebra, getting out of the blocks first and taking a lead. This caused the zebra to speed up, finishing in 9.957 seconds to Crawford's 10.86 seconds. Later he boasted to ESPN the Magazine, "tell the zebra I coulda whooped him." According to the USATF website, Crawford refers to himself as "Cheetah Man." He has publicly expressed his desire to run in war paint and urges spectators to look out for him at every meet.

In March 2004, he was favored to win the 60 meters world indoor title but was defeated by Jason Gardener of Great Britain by three hundredths of a second.

In the trials for the 2004 Summer Olympics, Crawford secured a place on the team by claiming third in the 100 m with a personal best of 9.93 s behind winner Maurice Greene and runner-up Justin Gatlin. Seven days later he placed first in the 200 m with a time of 19.99s, edging out Gatlin; Bernard Williams took third place. In June, Crawford improved on his 100 m personal best by running 9.88s in Eugene, Oregon.

At the 2004 Summer Olympics in Athens, Crawford ran the 100 m final in 9.89 s, finishing in fourth place just 0.04 s behind first-place finisher Justin Gatlin. That marked  the first race in history in which four competitors under 9.90s. Crawford went on to win the gold medal in the 200 m with a time of 19.79 s. He claimed a silver medal as part of the United States 4 × 100 m relay team.

He qualified for the 2008 Summer Olympics in the 200 m dash, finishing second at the trials after failing to qualify in the 100 m. He originally finished fourth in the 200 m final, but was later promoted to 2nd, winning silver, after fellow countryman Wallace Spearmon and Churandy Martina of the Netherlands Antilles were both disqualified for lane infringements. Although initially only Spearmon was disqualified, prompting the United States to consider filing a protest, review of race footage revealed an additional infraction by Martina. On August 28, in a gesture of sportsmanship, Crawford gave his medal to Martina. On March 6, 2009, the Court of Arbitration for Sport rejected an appeal by the National Olympic Committee of the Netherlands Antilles against Martina's disqualification.

Crawford won the 200 m at the 2009 USA Outdoor Track and Field Championships and qualified to represent the United States at the 2009 World Championships in Athletics. He ran 19.89 s in the final of the competition, his best time of the season, but finished fourth behind second-place Alonso Edward of Panama (19.81 s) and third-place Wallace Spearmon (19.85 s). First place finisher Usain Bolt set a new world record of 19.19 s.
On April 17, 2013, Crawford was  suspended for two years for missing out-of-competition drug tests. His coach, Bob Kersee claimed that Crawford retired after the 2012 United States Olympic Trials and USA Track & Field said he filed retirement papers in 2013.

Statistics

On 12 April 2002, Crawford became the first man to break ten seconds for the 100 metres for the first time and twenty seconds for the 200 metres for the first time, both on the same day, a feat he achieved in Pretoria, South Africa.

Personal bests

 All information from IAAF Profile

Major achievements
 2001
 World Championships in Athletics – Edmonton, Alberta, Canada.
 200 m bronze medalist
 World Indoor Championships – Lisbon, Portugal.
 200 m gold medal
 Goodwill Games – Brisbane, Australia.
 200 m gold medal
 2004
 World Indoor Championships – Budapest, Hungary.
 60 m silver medal
 Olympic Games – Athens, Greece.
 200 m gold medal
 4x100 m relay silver medal
 2008
 2008 Summer Olympics 200 m Silver Medal
 On January 31, 2009 according to the Associated Press "Shawn Crawford confirmed that he gave his Olympic silver medal to Churandy Martina, the sprinter who finished second in the 200 meters but was later disqualified for running out of his lane"

References

External links
 
 
 Shawn Crawford's U.S. Olympic Team bio
 Video Interview of Shawn Crawford during the 100th Millrose Games

1978 births
Living people
People from Lancaster County, South Carolina
Track and field athletes from South Carolina
Track and field athletes from California
African-American male track and field athletes
American male sprinters
Olympic male sprinters
Olympic gold medalists for the United States in track and field
Olympic silver medalists for the United States in track and field
Athletes (track and field) at the 2004 Summer Olympics
Athletes (track and field) at the 2008 Summer Olympics
Medalists at the 2008 Summer Olympics
Medalists at the 2004 Summer Olympics
Goodwill Games medalists in athletics
World Athletics Championships athletes for the United States
World Athletics Championships medalists
World Athletics Indoor Championships medalists
Clemson Tigers men's track and field athletes
USA Indoor Track and Field Championships winners
USA Outdoor Track and Field Championships winners
World Athletics Indoor Championships winners
Competitors at the 2001 Goodwill Games
Goodwill Games gold medalists in athletics
21st-century African-American sportspeople
20th-century African-American sportspeople